During the 1994–95 English football season, Notts County F.C. competed in the Football League First Division.

Season summary
In the early stages of the 1994–95 season, Walker was surprisingly sacked in September and this triggered a dramatic decline in the club's fortunes throughout the league campaign. Even though Notts County won the Anglo-Italian Cup at Wembley in March 1995, they ended the season relegated to Division Two.

Final league table

Results
Notts County's score comes first

Legend

Football League First Division

FA Cup

League Cup

Anglo-Italian Cup

Squad

References

Notts County F.C. seasons
Notts County